Kleinrinderfeld is a municipality within the district of Würzburg, Bavaria, Germany.

Sport
The towns association football club TSV Kleinrinderfeld experienced its greatest success in 2012 when it won promotion to the new northern division of the Bayernliga but lasted for only one season at this level before being relegated again.

References

Würzburg (district)